Bill Thomas (October 13, 1921 – May 30, 2000) was an Academy Award-winning American costume designer with over 180 credits, best known for films such as Babes in Toyland, Spartacus and The Happiest Millionaire. He was nominated ten times for the Academy Award for Best Costume Design, winning once for Spartacus.

In 2006 he was inducted into the Costume Designers Guild Hall of Fame.

Academy Award nominations and wins

References

External links

American costume designers
California people in fashion
1921 births
2000 deaths
Best Costume Design Academy Award winners
Artists from Chicago
Artists from Los Angeles